Anastasia Taylor-Lind (born 1981) is an English/Swedish photojournalist. She works for leading editorial publications globally on issues relating to women, population and war. She has lived in Damascus, Beirut, Kiev and New York City and is now based in London. As a photographic storyteller, Taylor-Lind's work has focused on long-form narrative reportage for monthly magazines.

Life and work
Taylor-Lind was born in Swindon in 1981. and completed degrees in documentary photography from the University of Wales, Newport, (BA) and the London College of Communication (MA). In 2003 whilst studying for her degree she spent a month in Iraqi Kurdistan photographing female Peshmerga fighters, the Peshmerga Force for Women.

As a photographic storyteller, Taylor-Lind's work has focused on long-form narrative reportage for monthly magazines. She is a National Geographic contributor, and other clients include Vanity Fair, The New Yorker, Time, The New York Times, British Journal of Photography, 6 Mois, Bloomberg Businessweek, The Telegraph, Human Rights Watch, Wired, and Nieman Reports

Taylor-Lind has been engaged with education, teaching at leading universities around the world. She is a TED fellow and gave a talk at the 2014 TED conference in Rio De Janeiro. Taylor-Lind is also Harvard Nieman fellow 2016, where she spent a year researching war, and how we tell stories about modern conflict. She is also a Logan fellow 2017 at the Carey Institute for Global Good. 

Her first book Maidan: Portraits from the Black Square, which documents the 2014 Ukrainian uprising in Kiev, was published by GOST books the same year, reviewed in the British Journal of Photography and The Guardian. The Guardian Sean O'Hagan wrote of the book
Maidan – Portraits from the Black Square is a powerfully concentrated statement, both about the nature and cost of violent protest. It eschews the familiar route of visceral, on-the-ground reportage for something more restrained and considered. You look into the faces of these ordinary people and you cannot help but wonder what it took to bring them to this point and what has happened to them since.
She published her second monograph, The Devil's Horsemen, in September 2018.

A wide variety of organizations have recognized and supported her projects through awards such as the Pictures of the Year International, Sony World Photography Awards, Royal Photographic Society Bursaries and the FNAC Grant at Visa pour l'Image. 

In 2016, Taylor-Lind served on the World Press Photo jury.

Together with journalist Alisa Sopova, Taylor-Lind has been documenting the war in eastern Ukraine since it began. Her work has been published in The New York Times, Time the Associated Press and the BBC World Service.

In 2019 Taylor-Lind documented New York City's childcare crisis for Time magazine. An exhibition of the work will be shown as one of Fotografiska's inaugural exhibitions opening in 2020.

Publications

Publications by Taylor-Lind
Maidan: Portraits from the Black Square. London: GOST, 2014. . 160 pages. Edition of 750 copies. With an interview with Taylor-Lind by Gordon MacDonald.
"In the Picture with Anastasia Taylor-Lind: Maidan – Portraits from the Black Square". Frontline Club. London, July 2014. 
The Devil's Horsemen. London. Published September 2018.  368 pages. Edition of 3000 copies.

Publications with contributions by Taylor-Lind
The Making of Maidan by Sebastian Meyer, 2014.
Honest pictures of war: Anastasia Taylor-Lind, ABC News. London, December 2015.
One Photographer's Small Project To Personalize Brutal East Ukraine War, Hromadske International, July 2015.
Great Britons of Photography Vol.1: The Dench Dozen. Eastbourne, UK: Hungry Eye, 2016. . Edited by Peter Dench. With photographs by and transcripts of interviews between Dench and Taylor-Lind, Jocelyn Bain Hogg, Marcus Bleasdale, Harry Borden, John Bulmer, Chris Floyd, Brian Griffin, Laura Pannack, Martin Parr, Tom Stoddart, and Homer Sykes. 160 pages. Edition of 500 copies.

Awards
2004: "Highly Commended" in the Observer Hodge award
2006: Top prize and winner of Portrait category, Guardian Weekend Photography Prize, The Guardian
2007 to 2009: Nominated for the Magenta Foundation Emerging Photographers Award
2009: Winner, Deutsche Bank Awards in photography
2011: Selected for the World Press Photo, Joop Swart Masterclass World Press Photo
2012: 3rd place, Arts Culture, Professional, Sony World Photography Awards, World Photography Organisation, London
2012: Shortlist, Professional Competition, Sony World Photography Awards, World Photography Organisation, London
2014: Ted Fellow Recipient, TED 
2016: Nieman Fellowship Recipient, Harvard University

References

External links

1981 births
Living people
People from Swindon
Photographers from Wiltshire